Lucius Septimius Flavianus Flavilatus was from Oenoanda in the region of Lycia and lived in the 3rd century AD.

Some of his achievements are documented by inscriptions in the base of a statue, discovered on the site of Oenoanda in 2002. He was an early recruit to the Roman army, and also a champion in wrestling and pankration.

Around 212, he won a boys' wrestling competition. An inscription records

Notes

References

Ancient Roman military personnel
Ancient Roman sportspeople
3rd-century people